

Gmina Golina is an urban-rural gmina (administrative district) in Konin County, Greater Poland Voivodeship, in west-central Poland.

Villages
Apart from the town of Golina, Gmina Golina contains the villages and settlements of Adamów, Barbarka, Bobrowo, Brzeźniak, Chrusty, Głodowo, Golina-Kolonia, Kawnice, Kolno, Kraśnica, Lubiecz, Myśliborskie Holendry, Myślibórz, Przyjma, Radolina, Rosocha, Sługocinek, Spławie and Węglew.

Neighbouring gminas
Gmina Golina is bordered by the city of Konin and by the gminas of Kazimierz Biskupi, Lądek, Rzgów, Słupca and Stare Miasto.

References
Polish official population figures, 2006

Golina
Konin County